Mbouri A Basile Yamkam (born 2 January 1998) is a Cameroonian international football defender playing for Radnički Niš in the Serbian SuperLiga.

Club career
He was part of the championship winning squad of PWD Bamenda in the 2019–20 Elite One season.  By final days of August 2021 he signed a two–years contract with Serbian side Radnički Niš.

International career
Yamkam has been playing since 2021 for the Cameroon national team.

Honours
PWD Bamenda
 Elite One: 2019–20

References

1998 births
Living people
Association football defenders
Cameroonian footballers
Cameroon international footballers
Cameroonian expatriate footballers
FK Radnički Niš players
Expatriate footballers in Serbia
Cameroonian expatriate sportspeople in Serbia
Cameroon A' international footballers
2020 African Nations Championship players